"Feel Special" is a song recorded by South Korean girl group Twice. It was composed by Hayley Aitken, Min Lee "Collapsedone", Ollipop and Park Jin-young, the latter of whom also wrote the lyrics for and produced the song. It was released by JYP Entertainment on September 23, 2019, along with its music video. It is the lead single and title track from the group's eighth EP Feel Special.

Background
Prior to the EP's release, the group released teasers on social media for the "Feel Special" music video, including individual clips for each member. On September 10, 2019, the day that Momo's clip was released, her name trended ahead of the Apple event on Twitter. Dahyun released a piano cover of the song on May 28, 2020, her 22nd birthday. She also performed vocals in the cover, however, she did not perform her rap part and instead played a piano solo. A Japanese version of "Feel Special" was included in the group's third Japanese language compilation album #Twice3, released on September 16, 2020.

Music and lyrics
"Feel Special" is a pop song written in the A-flat major key. Writing for Billboard, Tamar Herman described the song as "a vibrant, uplifting track", writing that the song "[opens] with quirky synths and [leads] into a groovy bass beat", slowly transitioning into "atmospheric verses and perky raps" and eventually enters "the boisterous, impactful chorus".

The lyrics of the song, which were written by Park Jin-young, was based on a conversation he had with members of Twice during dinner, in which they expressed the emotions they felt while dealing with the pressures of fame throughout the four years since their debut in 2015. "He expressed that into the lyrics," Nayeon explained. "This title track has our stories." She called the song one of the group's most memorable tracks. Members have regarded the song as being sincere and relatable with its personal and truthful lyrics. The key message of the song is "the shift from feeling insignificant to finding purpose".

In an interview with PopCrush, Chaeyoung said that the lyrics are meant to inspire fans to realize that they are not alone and appreciate the precious people around them during difficult times. Jeongyeon wants the song to serve as a motivation at times when people feel tired as life gets busy. Tzuyu said that the song "holds very true and sentimental lyrics" to their fans and the public, and noted that songs become tougher to perform as they get more relatable. She hopes that their fans can "find comfort in this song, and realize that they are not alone and it is awesome to love yourself". Mina has a solo verse in this song after the first chorus, towards the middle of the song. Kat Moon of Time pointed out that "the part she recorded for 'Feel Special' seems to echo the statements about her emotions toward performing". Dahyun stressed that the part after Mina's verse is the most important, which describes the sliver of hope appearing, and the progression "from nobody to somebody".

Reception

Critical reception 
Jeff Benjamin of the South China Morning Post included "Feel Special" in his "10 Best K-pop songs of 2019", ranking at number three and describing the song as a "stunning, synth-driven single that not only continued Twice’s string of pristine chart-toppers, but also had a deeper message about taking care of yourself." Kim Do-heon of IZM gave a mixed review for the song, calling its production "stylish but outdated", and noted that while the single successfully aimed for a more mature image, its "completeness and method of expression are the lowest among Twice's discography." Nevertheless, he stated that the entirety of Feel Special as a whole is worth listening due to "the well-placed urban and chic electropop [sound] under the lonely and calm atmosphere created by the title track."

Impact 
"Feel Special" was included in the Ubisoft dance rhythm game Just Dance 2021, which was released on November 12, 2020. On December 12, Joysound revealed the single to be the most popular K-pop song in Japanese karaoke for the year 2020, topping the "2020 Joysound Annual Ranking" list, and Twice having the most entries in the Top 20 with 4 songs. Joysound stated that Karaoke song rankings are an indicator to the kind of songs enjoyed by the Japanese general public, as opposed to album sales where fandom influence is inevitable.

Commercial performance
"Feel Special" reached the top of both Billboard'''s Kpop Hot 100 and World Digital Song Sales. It also peaked at number 4 on Billboard's Japan Hot 100, number 8 on RMNZ Hot Singles, number 9 on Gaon's Digital Chart, and number 13 on Oricon Digital Singles. The song also marks the group's first entry to Billboard's Canadian Hot 100, debuting at number 82.

In May 2020, "Feel Special" received Silver streaming certification for surpassing 30 million streams on Oricon Streaming Singles Chart from the Recording Industry Association of Japan (RIAJ).

Music video and promotion
The music video was released at 6 pm KST on September 23, 2019. It was watched more than 11 million times on YouTube in less than 16 hours after its release. In the video, members of the group are dressed up in unique looks to showcase their individual personalities and distinct roles in the group. Eight members of the group formed four pairs, in each pair, we see the members reach out to one another. Chaeyoung, who is inside a white dome, meets Mina as she approaches the dome and it turns transparent. Momo encounters Tzuyu, who is a goddess doll residing in a dollhouse. Nayeon, whose face is displayed on numerous TV screens, offers a smile of support to Jihyo. Dahyun, carrying an umbrella featuring Twice's colors, reaches out to Sana, who is sitting alone and soaked by the rain. Jeongyeon, not paired with any member, is seen feeling alone initially until she envisions herself joining other members of the group, enjoying herself and having fun. As of June 1, 2022, the video has over 400 million views.

Twice promoted "Feel Special" on several music programs in South Korea, including Inkigayo, M Countdown, and Show! Music Core'' from late-September to the middle of October. The group collected a total of seven wins for "Feel Special" throughout the course of its promotion. Twice also performed the song live during the Japanese leg of Twice World Tour 2019–2020 "Twicelights".

Credits and personnel
Credits adapted from Tidal.
 Park Jin-young – production, composition, lyrics
 Hayley Aitken – composition
 Ollipop – composition
 Min Lee "Collapsedone" – arrangement, composition
 Twice – vocals

Charts

Weekly charts

Monthly charts

Year-end charts

Certifications

See also 
 List of Inkigayo Chart winners (2019)
 List of K-pop Hot 100 number ones
 List of M Countdown Chart winners (2019)
 List of Music Bank Chart winners (2019)

References

2019 singles
2019 songs
Korean-language songs
Twice (group) songs
JYP Entertainment singles
Songs written by Hayley Aitken
Songs written by Park Jin-young
Billboard Korea K-Pop number-one singles